Sirichai Phumpat is a professional footballer from Thailand. He is currently playing for Navy in Thai League 3 as a  forward.

References

External links
 
 https://www.siamsport.co.th/player/441671/sirichai-phumpat
 http://player.7mth.com/603594/index.shtml

1996 births
Living people
Sirichai Phumpat
Association football forwards
Sirichai Phumpat
Sirichai Phumpat
Sirichai Phumpat